John Hodge was a Scottish footballer who played as a full-back. Born in Stenhousemuir, Scotland, he played for hometown club Stenhousemuir and for Manchester United (30 appearances in the English Football League over two seasons without scoring, before competitive football in England was suspended due to World War I), two clubs his brother Jimmy also played for.

External links
MUFCInfo.com profile

Scottish footballers
Manchester United F.C. players
Stenhousemuir F.C. players
People from Stenhousemuir
English Football League players
Footballers from Falkirk (council area)
Association football defenders
Year of birth missing